The 2008 Norwegian Football Cup Final was the final match of the 2008 Norwegian Football Cup, the 103rd season of the Norwegian Football Cup, the premier Norwegian football cup competition organized by the Football Association of Norway (NFF). The match was played on 9 November 2008 at the Ullevaal Stadion in Oslo, and opposed two Tippeligaen sides Stabæk and Vålerenga. Vålerenga defeated Stabæk 4–1 to claim the Norwegian Cup for a fourth time in their history.

Route to the final

Match

Details

References

2008
Vålerenga Fotball matches
Stabæk Fotball matches
Football Cup
Sports competitions in Oslo
2000s in Oslo
November 2008 sports events in Europe
Final